The secretary of social welfare and development (Filipino: Kalihim ng Kagalingang Panlipunan at Pagpapaunlad) is the head of the Department of Social Welfare and Development and is a member of the President's Cabinet.

The current secretary is Rex Gatchalian, who assumed office on January 31, 2023.

List of secretaries of social welfare and development

External links
DSWD website

References

 
Philippines
Social Welfare and Development